The Floating Hospital is a non-profit organization that provides healthcare services to medically underserved communities in New York City, both from its headquarters in Long Island City, Queens and from satellite offices in Brooklyn and the Bronx. Though today it is a land-based organization, the organization operated a succession of vessels which frequently cruised New York Harbor and nearby waterways, giving indigent children and their caregivers a respite from overcrowded tenements. While they were aboard, the Floating Hospital's staff of pediatricians, dentists, nurses, and social workers would provide healthcare services to children and health and nutrition education to their caregivers.

Despite its name, the organization does not operate a hospital in the usual sense.  It has functioned as an outpatient facility from its earliest days, though it was affiliated with an acute care hospital prior to World War II.  Presently, it is not affiliated with any other organization.  The Floating Hospital for Children in Boston, founded in 1894, was inspired by the Floating Hospital in New York but was always a separate organization.  It became a land-based acute care hospital in the 1930s and later merged with Tufts Medical Center.

History

Founding
The Floating Hospital traces its origins to October 1866 as a series of charitable excursions first conducted by steamboat tycoon John Starin for the benefit of newsboys, war veterans, and the needy. In the summer of 1872, George F. Williams, a managing editor of the New York Times, witnessed a policeman forcing a group of newsboys in City Hall Park off the grass and onto the concrete walkways, which burned their feet. When Williams returned to his office the next day, he wrote an appeal to the Times' readership for money to charter a boat trip for the city's newsboys and bootblacks, so that they could be turned loose on 
grassy shores of nearby waterways.

The next year, Williams asked the St. John's Guild to take over the organization of the trips, which had become more regular. The Guild was founded in 1866 as a charitable affiliate of St. John's Chapel of the Episcopal parish of Trinity Church. In 1875, the guild purchased and outfitted its first vessel, which was named for Emma Abbott, a famous singer and early benefactor. Two years later the guild severed its connections with the Episcopal Church and became non-sectarian. The hospital was officially "The Floating Hospital of the St. John's Guild" until 1980, when the guild was dissolved and the hospital was reincorporated as a wholly independent entity.

Early years
In subsequent decades the Floating Hospital served over 5 million children and their caregivers, through their program of regular outings on their vessels (which were apparently daily, at least in warmer months). Besides a strong recreational component, these outings also were seen as being medically important, because children were exposed to clean air and salt water, which were seen as curative by many people in that era, and also because while on-board they would be examined and treated by medical professionals. At the same time, other staff members could instruct caregivers in good child-rearing practices. A 1903 article in a nursing journal provides a sketch of the activities aboard the ship during these outings:

Seaside Hospital
The Seaside Hospital mentioned in the quotation above was also run by the St. John's Guild and was a frequent destination of Floating Hospital trips.  It was located on ten acres on the shore of the Atlantic Ocean in New Dorp, Staten Island, and was founded in 1881 and greatly expanded in 1899. The sickest children were transferred from the Floating Hospital to Seaside Hospital, where they were cared for by doctors and nurses and where their mothers were also accommodated.  Seaside Hospital was converted into a military hospital during World War II and demolished in the 1960s.

Later years
The Floating Hospital continued the basic formula of attracting families with recreational opportunities on board their vessel and providing professional medical services to them while they were aboard through the late 20th century. By the 1970s, the hospital described itself as "basically a disease prevention and referral agency" that focused on education, though it also provided outpatient services on its vessel, both during outings in summer months and while moored at its regular berth in the South Street Seaport during the winter.

The hospital's regular berth moved several times in its later years.  After using a Hudson River pier near 44th Street in the 1980s, for much of the 1990s it bounced between two piers in the East River: Pier 11 at the foot of Wall Street and Pier 17 at the foot of Fulton Street.  It was moored at Pier 11 in 2001 at the time of the September 11 attacks, which leveled the World Trade Center a short distance away.  Though undamaged, the Floating Hospital would never again find a suitable mooring site.  Pier 11 was needed for expanded ferry service to Lower Manhattan, and the management of Pier 17 was generally hostile to the presence of the vessel and its clients amid what they were promoting as an upscale retail venue.

In 2002, a temporary move to Brooklyn became permanent when the Floating Hospital was barred from Pier 17 and could not find another suitable berth in New York City where their clients could safely board the ship.  In 2003 the Hospital sold its vessel and became a land-based facility based in Chinatown.  Finally, in 2006 it moved to its present headquarters in Long Island City, Queens, an area designated at the time by the Federal government as medically underserved.

Vessels

The Floating Hospital owned 5 vessels over the 130 years that it provided marine-based services. Most of these were in fact engineless barges that were pulled around New York's waterways by tugboats. These were:
 Emma Abbott, barge, 1872–?
 Helen C. Juillard I, riverboat, 1899–1916
 Helen C. Juillard II, barge, 1916–1935 The second Helen C. Juillard was a wooden, non self propelled barge built from designs by Tams, Lemoine & Crane by the American Car and Foundry Company. The craft had four decks, the lower running from bow to stern just above the hull, two decks above termed the main deck and upper deck that were set back from the bow atop which was the hurricane deck with pilot house, an isolation ward, boats, ventilators and such other necessary structures. There was a waiting room, examination rooms, operating room and four wards. The dining room could seat 400 people. There were living quarters and separate facilities for medical staff and crew. A boiler provided steam for powering auxiliary equipment and electrical generation. Refrigeration facilities for food and fresh milk were installed. Life saving equipment, boats, rafts and life preservers were provided for a capacity of 1,600 people. A high capacity fire pump system with outlets throughout the vessel formed the fire fighting equipment. The barge was launched February 5, 1916, christened by the niece of the donor of the vessel, Mrs. A. D. Julliard.
 Lloyd I. Seaman, barge, 1935–1973
 Lila Acheson Wallace, barge, 1973–2003

Gallery
Most of these photos are undated, but are from collections that date from about 1900–1916.  The Helen Juillard vessel mentioned in the captions is probably the first one in most or all of these cases.

References

External links
 Floating Hospital website
 Outboard profile and deck plans for 1916 Helen C. Juillard

Healthcare in New York City
Nursing organizations in the United States
1875 establishments in New York (state)
Hospital ships
Medical and health organizations based in New York City
Long Island City